Ewaryst Estkowski (1820–1856) was a Polish teacher, education activist, and editor of Szkoła Polska (Polish School) magazine. Ewaryst Estkowski died 1856 in Germany Bad Soden am Taunus near Frankfurt Main.

References
 Witold Jakóbczyk, Przetrwać na Wartą 1815-1914, Dzieje narodu i państwa polskiego, vol. III-55, Krajowa Agencja Wydawnicza, Warszawa 1989

1820 births
1856 deaths
Polish schoolteachers
People from the Grand Duchy of Posen
Education activists